George L. Viavant (1872–1925) was a Louisiana artist who was inspired by the bayous, marshes, and lagoons of Southern Louisiana. Viavant painted the birds, fish, and small game that he knew from hunting the family land outside of New Orleans.

References

1872 births
1925 deaths
19th-century American painters
19th-century American male artists
American male painters
20th-century American painters
Artists from Louisiana
20th-century American male artists